The Independent Foreign Fiction Prize (1990–2015) was a British literary award. It was inaugurated by British newspaper The Independent to honour contemporary fiction in translation in the United Kingdom. The award was first launched in 1990 and ran for five years before falling into abeyance. It was revived in 2001 with the financial support of Arts Council England. Beginning in 2011 the administration of the prize was taken over by BookTrust, but retaining the "Independent" in the name. In 2015, the award was disbanded in a "reconfiguration" in which it was merged with the Man Booker International Prize.

Entries (fiction or short stories) were published in English translation in the UK in the year preceding the award by a living author. The prize acknowledged both the winning novelist and translator, each being awarded £5,000 and a magnum of champagne from drinks sponsor Champagne Taittinger.

Winners, shortlists and longlists 

Blue Ribbon = winner

1990
  Orhan Pamuk, The White Castle (Turkish, Victoria Holbrook)

1991

  Milan Kundera, Immortality (Czech, Peter Kussi)

1992
Shortlist
 Simon Leys, The Death Of Napoleon (French, Patricia Clancy)
Slavenka Drakulic, Holograms Of Fear (Croat, Ellen Elias-Barsaic)
Pawel Huelle, Who Was David Weiser? (Polish, Antonia Lloyd-Jones)
Yashar Kemal, To Crush The Serpent (Turkish, Thilda Kemal)
Ivan Klima, Judge On Trial (Czech, A G Brain)
Dacia Maraini, The Silent Duchess (Italian, Dick Kitto and Elspeth Spottiswood)
Carlo Mazzantini, In Search Of A Glorious Death (Italian, Simonetta Wenkert)
Erik Orsenna, Love And Empire (French, Jeremy Leggatt)
Giorgio Pressburger, The Law Of White Spaces (Italian, Piers Spence)
Jean Rouaud, Fields Of Glory (French, Ralph Manheim)
Leonardio Sciascia, The Knight And Death (Italian, Joseph Farrell and Marie Evans)
Antonio Tabucchi, Vanishing Point (Italian, Tim Parks)

1993

Shortlist
  José Saramago, The Year of the Death of Ricardo Reis (Portuguese, Giovanni Pontiero)
 Juan Goytisolo, Makbara (Spanish, Helen Lane)
 Gunter Grass, The Call Of The Toad (German, Ralph Manheim)
 Ismail Kadare, The Palace of Dreams (Albanian, Barbara Bray—from author's French translation)
 Ivan Klima, My Golden Trades (Czech, Paul Wilson)
 A B Yehoshua, Mr Mani (Hebrew, Hillel Halkin)

1994

Shortlist 
  Bao Ninh, The Sorrow of War (Vietnamese, Frank Palmos and Phanh Thanh Hao)
 Shusaku Endo, Deep River (Japanese, Van C Gessel)
 Margriet de Moor, First Grey, Then White, Then Blue (Dutch, Paul Vincent)
 Isabel Allende, The Infinite Plan (Spanish, Margaret Sayers Peden)
Amos Oz, Fima, (Hebrew, Nicholas de Lange)
Italo Calvino, The Road To San Giovanni (Italian, Tim Parks)

1995
  Gert Hofmann, The Film Explainer (German, Michael Hofmann)

1996 to 2000
Prize in abeyance.

2001
Shortlist

  Marta Morazzoni, The Alphonse Courrier Affair (Italian, Emma Rose)
 Marc Dugain, The Officers' Ward (French, Howard Curtis)
 Michel Houellebecq, Atomised (also published as "The Elementary Particles") (French, Frank Wynne)
 Antonio Tabucchi, The Missing Head of Damasceno Monteiro (Italian, Patrick Creagh)
 May Telmissany, Dunyazard (French, Roger Allen)
 Hans-Ulrich Treichel, Lost (German, Carol Brown Janeaway)

2002
Shortlist

  W.G. Sebald (posthumously), Austerlitz (German, Anthea Bell)
 Agnès Desarthe, Five Photos of My Wife (French, Adriana Hunter)
 Dai Sijie, Balzac and the Little Chinese Seamstress (French, Ina Rilke)
 Andrey Kurkov, Death and the Penguin (Russian, George Bird)
 Hanan al-Shaykh, Only in London (Arabic, Catherine Cobham)
 H.M. van den Brink, On the Water (Dutch, Paul Vincent)

2003
Shortlist
  Per Olov Enquist, The Visit of the Royal Physician (Swedish, Tiina Nunnally)
 Frédéric Beigbeder, £9.99 (French, Adriana Hunter)
 Peter Stephan Jungk, The Snowflake Constant (German, Michael Hofmann)
 Mario Vargas Llosa, The Feast of the Goat (Spanish, Edith Grossman)
 José Saramago, The Cave (Portuguese, Margaret Jull Costa)
 José Carlos Somoza, The Athenian Murders (Spanish, Sonia Soto)

Also longlisted

 Umberto Eco, Baudolino (Italian, William Weaver)
 Jens Christian Grøndahl, Lucca (Danish, Anne Born)
 Norbert Gstrein, The English Years (German, Anthea Bell)
 Milton Hatoum, The Brothers (Portuguese, John Gledson)
Michel Houellebecq, Platform (French, Frank Wynne)
Milan Kundera, Ignorance (French, Linda Asher)
Amin Maalouf, Balthasar's Odyssey (French, Barbara Bray)
Patricia Melo, Inferno (Portuguese, Clifford E Landers)
Arturo Pérez-Reverte, The Nautical Chart (Spanish, Margaret Sayers Peden)
Atiq Rahimi, Earth And Ashes (Dari/Afghanistan, Erdağ Göknar)

2004
Shortlist
  Javier Cercas, Soldiers of Salamis (Spanish, Anne McLean)
 Juan Marsé, Lizard Tails (Spanish, Nick Caistor)
 Elke Schmitter, Mrs Sartoris (German, Carol Brown Janeway)
 Ricardo Piglia, Money to Burn (Spanish, Amanda Hopkinson)
 Luther Blissett, Q (Italian, Shaun Whiteside)
 Mahi Binebine, Welcome to Paradise (French, Lulu Norman)

Also longlisted
 Lars Saabye Christensen, The Half Brother (translated by Kenneth Stevens)
Gil Courtemanche, A Sunday At The Pool In Kigali (translated by Patricia Claxton)
Turki Al-Hamad, Adama (translated by Robin Bray)
Javier Marias, Dark Back Of Time (translated by Esther Allen)
Sten Nadolny, The Discovery Of Slowness (translated by Ralph Freedman)
Per Petterson, In The Wake (translated by Anne Born)
Shan Sa, The Girl Who Played Go (translated by Adriana Hunter)
Fred Vargas, Have Mercy On Us All (translated by David Bellos)
Ye Zhaoyan, Nanjing 1937 (translated by Michael Berry)
Akira Yoshimura, One Man's Justice (translated by Mark Ealey)

2005
Shortlist
  Frédéric Beigbeder, Windows on the World (French, trans. by Frank Wynne)
 Chico Buarque, Budapest, (Portuguese, trans. by Alison Entrekin)
 Irina Denezhkina, Give Me (Songs for Lovers), (Russian, trans. by Andrew Bromfield)
 Xiaolu Guo, Village of Stone, (Chinese, trans. by Cindy Carter)
 Orhan Pamuk, Snow, (Turkish, trans. by Maureen Freely)
 Elif Şafak, The Flea Palace, (Turkish, trans. by Muge Gocek)

Also longlisted

 David Albahari, Götz and Meyer (Serbian, translated by Ellen Elias-Bursac)
 Merete Morken Andersen, Oceans of Time (Norwegian, Barbara J Haveland)
 Mia Couto, The Last Flight of the Flamingo (Portuguese, David Brookshaw)
 Edgardo Cozarinsky, The Bride from Odessa (Spanish, Nick Caistor)
 Victor Erofeyev, Life with an Idiot (Russian, Andrew Reynolds)
 Turki al-Hamad, Shumaisi (Arabic, Paul Starkey)
 Torgny Lindgren, Hash (Swedish, Tom Geddes)
 Enrico Remmert, The Ballad of the Low Lifes (Italian, Aubrey Botsford)
 José Saramago, The Double (Portuguese, Margaret Jull Costa)
 Carlos Ruiz Zafon, The Shadow of the Wind (Spanish, Lucia Graves)

2006
The 2006 prize was announced in May.  The jury for the 2006 Prize was composed of: Boyd Tonkin (Literary Editor, The Independent), the writers Paul Bailey, Margaret Busby and Maureen Freely, and Kate Griffin (Arts Council England).

Shortlist
  Per Petterson, Out Stealing Horses (Norwegian; Anne Born; Harvill Secker)
 Pawel Huelle, Mercedes-Benz (Polish; Antonia Lloyd-Jones; Serpent's Tail)
 Tahar Ben Jelloun, This Blinding Absence of Light (French; Linda Coverdale; Penguin)
 Imre Kertész, Fatelessness (Hungarian; Tim Wilkinson; Harvill Secker)
 Magda Szabó, The Door (Hungarian; Len Rix; Harvill Secker)
 Dubravka Ugrešić, The Ministry of Pain (Croatian; Michael Henry Heim; Saqi)

Also longlisted
 Tonino Benacquista, Someone Else (translated from the French by Adriana Hunter; Bitter Lemon)
 Stefan Chwin, Death in Danzig (Polish; Philip Boehm; Secker & Warburg)
 Philippe Claudel, Grey Souls (French; Adriana Hunter; Weidenfeld & Nicolson)
 Marie Darrieussecq, White (French; Ian Monk; Faber)
 Karen Duve, This is Not a Love Song (German; Anthea Bell; Bloomsbury)
 David Grossman, Lovers and Strangers (Hebrew; Jessica Cohen; Bloomsbury)
 Judith Hermann, Nothing but Ghosts (German; Margot Bettauer Dembo; Fourth Estate)
 Ellen Mattson, Snow (Swedish; Sarah Death; Jonathan Cape)
 Haruki Murakami, Kafka on the Shore (Japanese; Philip Gabriel; Vintage)
 Dai Sijie, Mr Muo's Travelling Couch (French; Ina Rilke; Chatto & Windus)

2007
Shortlist
  José Eduardo Agualusa, The Book of Chameleons, (Portuguese, trans. Daniel Hahn)
 Per Olov Enquist, The Story of Blanche and Marie, (Swedish, trans. Tiina Nunnally)
 Vangelis Hatziyannidis, Four Walls (Greek, trans. Anne-Marie Stanton-Ife)
 Javier Marías, Your Face Tomorrow, 2: Dance and Dream (trans. Margaret Jull Costa)
 Eva Menasse, Vienna (German, trans. Anthea Bell) 
 Dag Solstad, Shyness and Dignity (Norwegian, trans. Sverre Lyngstad)

Also longlisted

Kader Abdolah, My Father's Notebook (translated by Susan Massotty from Dutch; Canongate)
Niccolò Ammaniti, Steal You Away (Jonathan Hunt; Italian; Canongate)
Javier Cercas, The Speed of Light (Anne McLean; Spanish; Bloomsbury)
Edgardo Cozarinsky, The Moldavian Pimp (Nick Caistor; Spanish; Harvill Secker)
Jenny Erpenbeck, The Old Child (Susan Bernofsky; German; Portobello)
Faïza Guène, Just Like Tomorrow (Sarah Adams; French; Chatto & Windus)
Ismail Kadare, The Successor (David Bellos; French; Canongate)
Ma Jian, Stick out your Tongue (Flora Drew; Chinese; Chatto & Windus)
Ngugi wa Thiong'o, Wizard of the Crow (the author; Gikuyu; Harvill Secker)
Leonardo Padura, Havana Black (Peter Bush; Spanish; Bitter Lemon)
Atiq Rahimi, A Thousand Rooms of Dream and Fear (Sarah Maguire & Yama Yari; Dari; Chatto & Windus)
José Saramago, Seeing (Margaret Jull Costa; Portuguese; Harvill Secker)
Elif Shafak, The Gaze (Brendan Freely; Turkish; Marion Boyars)
Linn Ullmann, Grace (Barbara Haveland; Norwegian; Picador)

2008
Shortlist
   Paul Verhaeghen, Omega Minor (translated by the author from the Dutch)
 Pawel Huelle, Castorp (translated by Antonia Lloyd Jones from the Polish)
 Daniel Kehlmann, Measuring the World (translated by Carol Brown Janeway from the German)
 Bengt Ohlsson, Gregorius (translated by Silvester Mazzarella from the Swedish)
 Lars Saabye Christensen, The Model (translated by Don Barlett from the Norwegian)
 Marlene van Niekerk, The Way of the Women (translated by Michiel Heyns from the Afrikaans)

Also longlisted
 Alaa al Aswany, The Yacoubian Building (translated by Humphrey Davies from the Arabic)
 Jenny Erpenbeck, The Book of Words (translated by Susan Bernofsky from the German)
 Bi Feiyu, The Moon Opera (translated by Howard Goldblatt from the Chinese)
 Ismail Kadare, Agamemnon's Daughter (translated by David Bellos from the French)
 Sayed Kashua, Let It Be Morning (translated by Miraim Shlesinger from the Hebrew)
 Erwin Mortier, Shutterspeed (translated by Ina Rilke from the Dutch)
 Alan Pauls, The Past (translated by Nick Caistor from the Spanish)
 Peter Pišťanek, Rivers of Babylon (translated by Peter Petro from the Slovak)
 Laura Restrepo, Delirium (translated by Natasha Wimmer from the Spanish)
 Yasmina Traboulsi, Bahia Blues (translated by Polly McLean from the French)
 Enrique Vila-Matas, Montano (translated by Jonathan Dunne from the Spanish)

2009
Shortlist
  Evelio Rosero, The Armies (translated by Anne McLean from the Spanish)
 Celine Curiol, Voice Over (translated by Sam Richard from the French)
 Ma Jian, Beijing Coma (translated by Flora Drew from the Chinese)
 Ismail Kadare, The Siege (translated by David Bellos from the Albanian via French)
 Juan Gabriel Vasquez, The Informers (translated by Anne McLean from the Spanish)
 AB Yehoshua, Friendly Fire (translated by Stuart Schoffman from the Hebrew)

Also longlisted
 Sjón, The Blue Fox (translated by Victoria Cribb from the Icelandic)
 Jose Eduardo Agualusa, My Father's Wives (translated by Daniel Hahn from the Portuguese)
 Dag Solstad, Novel 11, Book 18 (translated by Sverre Lyngstad from the Norwegian)
 Yōko Ogawa, The Diving Pool (translated by Stephen Snyder from the Japanese)
 Eshkol Nevo, Homesick (translated by Sondra Silverston from the Hebrew)
 Linn Ullmann, A Blessed Child (translated by Sarah Death from the Norwegian)
 Thomas Glavinic, Night Work (translated by John Brownjohn from the German)
 Gyorgy Dragoman, The White King (translated by Paul Olchvary from the Hungarian)
 Alexander Ahndoril, The Director (translated by Sarah Death from the Swedish)
 Saša Stanišić, How the Soldier Repairs the Gramophone (translated by Anthea Bell from the German)

2010
Shortlist
 Philippe Claudel, Brodeck's Report (translated by John Cullen; French) MacLehose Press
Julia Franck, The Blindness of the Heart (translated by Anthea Bell; German) Harvill Secker
Pietro Grossi, Fists (translated by Howard Curtis; Italian) Pushkin Press
Alain Mabanckou, Broken Glass (translated by Helen Stevenson; French) Serpent's Tail
Sankar, Chowringhee (translated by Arunava Sinha; Bengali) Atlantic
Rafik Schami, The Dark Side of Love (translated by Anthea Bell; German) Arabia Books

Also longlisted
Boris Akunin, The Coronation (translated by Andrew Bromfield from the Russian) Weidenfeld & Nicolson
Ketil Bjørnstad, To Music (translated by Deborah Dawkin & Erik Skuggevik; Norwegian) Maia Press
Hassan Blasim, The Madman of Freedom Square (translated by Jonathan Wright; Arabic) Comma Press
Elias Khoury, Yalo (translated by Humphrey Davies; Arabic) MacLehose Press
Jonathan Littell, The Kindly Ones (translated by Charlotte Mandell; French) Chatto & Windus
Javier Marías, Your Face Tomorrow, Volume 3: Poison, Shadow and Farewell (translated by Margaret Jull Costa; Spanish) Chatto & Windus
Yōko Ogawa, The Housekeeper and the Professor (translated by Stephen Snyder; Japanese) Harvill Secker
Claudia Piñeiro, Thursday Night Widows (translated by Miranda France; Spanish) Bitter Lemon Press
Bahaa Taher, Sunset Oasis (translated by Humphrey Davies; Arabic) Sceptre

2011
Shortlist
  Santiago Roncagliolo, Red April  translated by Edith Grossman (Atlantic Books), Spanish
 Marcelo Figueras, Kamchatka translated by Frank Wynne (Atlantic Books), Spanish
 Alberto Berrera Tyszka, The Sickness translated by Margaret Jull Costa (Maclehose Press), Spanish
 Jenny Erpenbeck, Visitation translated by Susan Bernofsky (Portobello Books), German
 Orhan Pamuk, The Museum of Innocence translated by Maureen Freely (Faber), Turkish
 Per Petterson, I Curse the River of Time translated by Charlotte Barslund with Per Petterson (Harvill Secker), Norwegian

Also longlisted
 Veronique Olmi, Beside the Sea; translated by Adriana Hunter (Peirene Press), French
 David Grossman, To the End of the Land; translated by Jessica Cohen (Jonathan Cape), Hebrew
 Daniel Kehlmann, Fame translated by Carol Brown Janeway (Quercus), German
 Juan Gabriel Vasquez, The Secret History of Costaguana translated by Anne McLean (Bloomsbury), Spanish
 Michal Witkowski, Lovetown translated by W Martin (Portobello Books), Polish
 Jachym Topol, Gargling with Tar translated by David Short (Portobello Books), Czech
 Juli Zeh, Dark Matter translated by Christine Lo (Harvill Secker), German
 Shuichi Yoshida, Villain translated by Philip Gabriel (Harvill Secker), Japanese
 Per Wästberg, The Journey of Anders Sparrman translated by Tom Geddes (Granta), Swedish

2012

Shortlist
  Aharon Appelfeld, Blooms of Darkness translated from the Hebrew by Jeffrey M. Green (Alma Books)
Judith Hermann, Alice translated from the German by Margot Bettauer Dembo (The Clerkenwell Press)
Yan Lianke, Dream of Ding Village translated from the Chinese by Cindy Carter (Corsair)
Sjón, From the Mouth of the Whale translated from the Icelandic by Victoria Cribb (Telegram Books)
Diego Marani, New Finnish Grammar translated from the Italian by Judith Landry (Dedalus)
Umberto Eco, The Prague Cemetery translated from the Italian by Richard Dixon (Harvill Secker)

Also longlisted
Haruki Murakami, 1Q84: Books 1 and 2, translated from the Japanese by Jay Rubin (Harvill Secker)
Steve Sem-Sandberg, The Emperor of Lies translated from the Swedish by Sarah Death (Faber)
Tristan Garcia, Hate: A Romance translated from the French by Marion Duvert and Lorin Stein (Faber)
Matthias Politycki, Next World Novella translated from the German by Anthea Bell (Peirene Press)
Péter Nádas, Parallel Stories translated from the Hungarian by Imre Goldstein (Jonathan Cape)
Kyung-sook Shin, Please Look After Mother translated from the Korean by Shin Chi-Young Kim (Weidenfeld & Nicolson)
Dag Solstad, Professor Andersen's Night translated from the Norwegian by Agnes Scott Langeland (Harvill Secker)
Amos Oz, Scenes From Village Life translated from the Hebrew by Nicholas De Lange (Chatto & Windus)
Bernardo Atxaga, Seven Houses in France translated from the Spanish by Margaret Jull Costa (Harvill Secker)

2013

Shortlist

 Gerbrand Bakker, The Detour (translated by David Colmer from the Dutch), Harvill Secker
Chris Barnard, Bundu (Michiel Heyns; Afrikaans), Alma Books
Daša Drndić, Trieste (Ellen Elias-Bursać; Croatian), MacLehose Press
Ismail Kadare, The Fall of the Stone City (John Hodgson; Albanian), Canongate
Andrés Neuman, Traveller of the Century (Nick Caistor & Lorenza Garcia; Spanish), Pushkin Press
Enrique Vila-Matas, Dublinesque (Rosalind Harvey & Anne McLean; Spanish), Harvill Secker

Also longlisted
Laurent Binet, HHhH (Sam Taylor; French), Harvill Secker
Pawel Huelle, Cold Sea Stories (Antonia Lloyd-Jones; Polish), Comma Press
Pia Juul, The Murder of Halland (Martin Aitken; Danish), Peirene Press
Khaled Khalifa, In Praise of Hatred (Leri Price; Arabic), Doubleday
Karl Ove Knausgaard, A Death in the Family (book 1 of My Struggle) (Don Bartlett; Norwegian), Harvill Secker
László Krasznahorkai, Satantango (George Szirtes; Hungarian), Tuskar Rock
Alain Mabanckou, Black Bazaar (Sarah Ardizzone; French), Serpent's Tail
Diego Marani, The Last of the Vostyachs (Judith Landry; Italian), Dedalus
Orhan Pamuk, Silent House (Robert Finn; Turkish), Faber
Juan Gabriel Vásquez, The Sound of Things Falling (Anne McLean; Spanish), Bloomsbury

2014
Shortlist

 Hassan Blasim, The Iraqi Christ (Arabic; trans. Jonathan Wright)
Karl Ove Knausgaard, A Man in Love (book 2 of My Struggle) (Norwegian; trans. Don Bartlett)
Hiromi Kawakami, Strange Weather in Tokyo (Japanese; trans. Allison Markin Powell)  
Hubert Mingarelli, A Meal in Winter (French; trans. Sam Taylor) 
Yōko Ogawa, Revenge (Japanese; trans. Stephen Snyder) 
Birgit Vanderbeke, The Mussel Feast (German; trans. Jamie Bulloch) - special mention by the jury.

Also longlisted

Sinan Antoon, The Corpse Washer (Arabic; translated by the author) 
Julia Franck, Back to Back (German; trans. Anthea Bell) 
Sayed Kashua, Exposure (Hebrew; trans. Mitch Ginsberg) 
Andrej Longo, Ten (Italian; trans. Howard Curtis) 
Ma Jian, The Dark Road (Chinese; trans. Flora Drew) 
Andreï Makine, Brief Loves that Live Forever (French; trans. Geoffrey Strachan) 
Javier Marías, The Infatuations (Spanish; trans. Margaret Jull Costa) 
Auður Ava Ólafsdóttir, Butterflies in November (Icelandic; trans. Brian FitzGibbon) 
Jón Kalman Stefánsson, The Sorrow of Angels (Icelandic; trans. Philip Roughton)

2015
Shortlist
 Jenny Erpenbeck, The End of Days (German; trans. Susan Bernofsky)
Juan Tomás Ávila Laurel, By Night the Mountain Burns (Spanish; trans. Jethro Soutar) 
Haruki Murakami, Colorless Tsukuru Tazaki and His Years of Pilgrimage (Japanese; trans. Philip Gabriel)
Daniel Kehlmann, F (German; trans. Carol Brown Janeway) 
Tomás González, In the Beginning Was the Sea (Spanish; trans. Frank Wynne)
Erwin Mortier, While the Gods Were Sleeping (Dutch; trans. Paul Vincent)

Also longlisted

Tomas Bannerhed, The Ravens (Swedish; trans. Sarah Death) 
Marcello Fois, Bloodlines (Italian; trans. Silvester Mazzarella) 
Hamid Ismailov, The Dead Lake (Russian; trans. Andrew Bromfield)
Karl Ove Knausgaard, Boyhood Island (book 3 of My Struggle) (Norwegian; trans. Don Bartlett (translator))
Jung-Myung Lee, The Investigation (Korean; trans. Chi-Young Kim) 
Judith Schalansky, The Giraffe's Neck (German; trans. Shaun Whiteside)
Stefanie de Velasco, Tiger Milk (German; trans. Tim Mohr)
Timur Vermes, Look Who's Back (German; trans. Jamie Bulloch) 
Can Xue, The Last Lover (Chinese; trans. Annelise Finegan Wasmoen)

References

English literary awards
British fiction awards
Translation awards
Awards established in 1990
The Independent
Literary awards by magazines and newspapers
1990 establishments in the United Kingdom
2015 disestablishments in the United Kingdom